The canton of Lattes is an administrative division of the Hérault department, southern France. Its borders were modified at the French canton reorganisation which came into effect in March 2015. Its seat is in Lattes.

Composition 

It consists of the following communes:
 Juvignac
 Lattes
 Lavérune
 Pérols
 Saint-Jean-de-Védas

Councillors

Pictures of the canton

References

External links 

 Site of INSEE

Lattes